Michael or Mick Cronin may refer to:

Sports
Mick Cronin (hurler) (1902–1982), Irish hurler
Mick Cronin (footballer) (1911–1979), Australian rules football player, umpire and television commentator
Mick Cronin (rugby league) (born 1951), Australian rugby league footballer
Michael Cronin (cricketer) (born 1961), English cricketer 
Mick Cronin (basketball) (born 1971), American basketball coach

Other people
Michael Cronin (actor) (born 1942), English actor and author
Michael Cronin (academic) (born 1960), Irish author and academic

See also
Mikal Cronin (born 1985), American musician
Mikal Cronin (album)